HPCx was a supercomputer (actually a cluster of IBM eServer p5 575 high-performance servers)  located at the Daresbury Laboratory in Cheshire, England. The supercomputer was maintained by the HPCx Consortium, UoE HPCX Ltd, which was led by the University of Edinburgh: EPCC, with the Science and Technology Facilities Council and IBM. The project was funded by EPSRC. 

The HPCx service ended in January 2010,

References

External links
 www.hpcx.ac.uk 
 EPCC Website

Cluster computing
Computer science education in the United Kingdom
Research institutes in Cheshire
Supercomputers